Abigail "Abby" Anderson is a fictional character in the video game The Last of Us Part II (2020) by Naughty Dog. She is portrayed by Laura Bailey through motion capture and voice acting. A soldier of the Washington Liberation Front (WLF), Abby seeks to avenge her father's death by killing Joel Miller. Her alliances later become unsettled when she befriends two ex-members of the Seraphites, a religious cult with which the WLF is locked in a war. Abby is one of two main playable characters in the game, alongside Ellie.

Abby was created by Neil Druckmann and Halley Gross, the writers of The Last of Us Part II. The original switch to playing as Abby was done to demonstrate her personality; Druckmann wanted players to hate Abby early in the game, but later empathize with her through her flaws and redemptive actions. He wanted to avoid casting Bailey due to her proliferation of roles, but was impressed with her audition tape in how she had played into Abby's vulnerability. Bailey worked out in preparation for the role, and gave birth to her first son during production. She also prepared by researching people involved in wars and their coping mechanisms. Abby's face was modeled on Jocelyn Mettler, while her body was based on Colleen Fotsch.

The character of Abby was well-received by critics, with many noting that her redemption arc was believable and made the character likable by the game's end. Her playable chapters were controversial among players, and Bailey became the target of online death threats; some critics felt that the character had been unfairly maligned, and that criticisms of her muscular physique was a result of the lack of body diversity in video games. Bailey's performance was widely praised and she received accolades at the British Academy Games Awards, The Game Awards, and the NAVGTR Awards.

Creation

Design and casting 
Abby is described as having a "commanding presence", with her physical build reflecting the years of training and combat. Her design underwent several iterations, with the goal to portray her as "capable, utilitarian, and strong". When auditioning actors for Abby, creative director Neil Druckmann specifically wanted to avoid casting Laura Bailey due to her proliferation of roles; he had originally considered Bailey to play Dina. When reviewing her audition tape, however, Druckmann was impressed by how Bailey had played into Abby's vulnerability, whereas other actors emphasized her anger. Bailey considers the game important to her personally, as she gave birth to her first son during production. Prior to her pregnancy, Bailey was working out in preparation for the role. While pregnant, she attempted to conceal her walk during her performance. She prepared for the role by researching people involved in wars and their coping mechanisms. While performing the scene in which Abby kills Joel—portrayed by Bailey's friend Troy Baker—Bailey continually checked in with Baker due to the intensity of the scene. Abby's face is based on Jocelyn Mettler, a visual effects artist who formerly worked at Naughty Dog, while her body was based on athlete Colleen Fotsch.

Writing 

An early iteration of the story had a young Abby witnessing an attack on her group by Joel and Tommy, who were hunters at the time (in the unseen 20 years of the first game), and vowing revenge. As the story and its theme of violence developed, the writers found it more interesting for Abby's father to have been killed by the player in the first game and directly tie into Joel's actions. The switch to Abby in the game's first chapter was done to demonstrate her personality and vulnerabilities and avoid her portrayal as a typical antagonist. She was originally set to be the primary playable character for the game's early hours before killing Joel, but the plot was restructured, and Druckmann felt that personalizing the character too early in the game was "too easy"; he wanted players to hate Abby early in the game, but later empathize with her. He avoided writing her as a "perfect" character, instead prompting empathy through her flaws and redemptive actions. Druckmann told Bailey to avoid smiling as Abby, noting that "it should feel like a reward if she's smiling". One of Abby's most notable vulnerabilities is her crippling fear of heights.

Some of the game's flashback scenes with Abby initially depicted her joining the WLF, though it was an unconscious decision on her behalf, as the leader of the WLF was a fellow member of her former group and acted as a father figure for her. Abby's goal to kill Joel was fueled by her desire to return to a world before her father's death, but she discovers it impossible. After witnessing Owen's refusal to give up looking for a "light" in a world of darkness, she finds her own purpose in protecting Yara and Lev, which Druckmann felt mirrored Joel's redemption arc from the first game. Owen represents emotion in contrast to Abby's pessimism. The obstacles she overcomes when gathering medical supplies to save Yara's life demonstrates the lengths to which she will go to help the children and redeem herself. Margenau felt that Abby was inspired to abandon her alliances after witnessing Lev's rebellious nature. Abby's plea to the Santa Barbara Rattlers to leave Lev alone is an intentional parallel with Ellie's plea for Abby to spare Joel earlier in the game. While shooting the final part of Abby and Ellie's climatic fight, in which Ellie tries to drown Abby by grabbing her throat and pinning her down in shallow water before eventually sparing her, Bailey held her breath for the entire section; Ashley Johnson, who plays Ellie, let go when she realized that Bailey's lips were turning blue. Bailey felt that Abby understood Ellie's emotions by the game's end, having dealt with her own father's death.

Appearance 
Abby's father, Jerry Anderson, was a Firefly surgeon whom Joel killed at the end of the first game to save Ellie. Four years later, in her early twenties, she tracks Joel down in Jackson, Wyoming, and beats him to death. Some time later, back in Seattle, Abby learns that her ex-boyfriend Owen has gone missing while investigating the Seraphites, a religious cult locked in a war with the Washington Liberation Front (WLF), the militia of which Abby is a member. WLF leader Isaac Dixon believes Owen may have defected, and plans to assault the Seraphites' nearby island settlement. Searching for Owen, Abby is captured and witnesses the Seraphites shatter the arm of a runaway Seraphite named Yara. After being rescued by Yara's younger brother Lev, they arrive at the aquarium, where Abby finds Owen. He plans to sail to Santa Barbara, California, where the Fireflies are supposedly regrouping. Yara's arm requires amputation, so Abby and Lev retrieve medical supplies from the hospital, which is overrun by Infected. Lev runs away to the Seraphite settlement to convince their mother to leave the cult. Abby and Yara pursue him, fending off an attack from Tommy, Joel's vengeful younger brother.

At the settlement, they discover Lev has killed his devout mother in self-defense. As the WLF attack the settlement, Yara kills Isaac and sacrifices herself to let Abby and Lev escape. Abby and Lev return to the aquarium to find Owen and his pregnant girlfriend Mel killed and a map leading to Ellie's theater hideout. At the theater, Abby kills Jesse and shoots Tommy, crippling him. She overpowers Ellie and Dina but, after learning that Dina is pregnant, spares them at Lev's insistence and warns them to leave. Some time later, Abby and Lev arrive in Santa Barbara searching for the Fireflies, but are captured by the Rattlers, a gang of slave-keeping bandits. After being weakened by weeks of torture, they are rescued by Ellie. Threatening to kill Lev, Ellie forces Abby to fight her. Ellie overpowers her but lets her live. Abby sails away with Lev towards the Firefly base on Catalina Island.

Reception 

Abby's character received generally positive feedback from critics, and Bailey's performance was highly praised. John Saavedra of Den of Geek lauded Bailey for bringing Abby to life and making the player empathize with her by the game's end. He lauded the character's camaraderie with her companions, particularly Manny. VG247s Caitlin Galiz-Rowe found Abby's redemption arc more believable and important than others in the game. Jason Sheehan of NPR wrote that witnessing the story through Abby's perspective proved that her revenge was "just as earned" as Ellie's. Kat Bailey of USgamer appreciated the ambition of the player switch, but felt that it "just barely" pulled it off. VentureBeats Dean Takahashi concluded that Abby redeemed herself by sparing Ellie and praised Naughty Dog's ability to make the character likable by the game's end. Rafael Motamayor of Observer found Abby's story as interesting as Ellie's, and felt that its use within the story made Ellie a better character as well. Mashables Jess Joho considered Abby's story to be more nuanced and compelling, but criticized both characters for relying too heavily on their relationships with their fathers; Joho felt that the story was at its best with Abby and Lev.

Abby's playable chapters were controversial among players, who had expected to control Ellie for the majority of the game. Writing for Collider, Dave Trumbore felt that Abby had been unfairly maligned by audiences, feeling they had failed to understand the story's message and subtext. Some players criticized Abby's muscular physique, and theories spread online that she was transgender; Polygons Patricia Hernandez and The Independents Amy Coles argued that this perception was a result of the lack of body diversity in games, and that the story showed Abby had the resources to achieve her physique. Bailey became the target of online death threats in response to the character; Naughty Dog released a statement condemning the threats, and Bailey was supported by James Gunn, Ashley Johnson, and Craig Mazin, among others. Bailey spoke to friends like Druckmann and Johnson at the time of the controversy. She said that she continues to "see the remnants of it online" in February 2022.

For her role, Bailey won Best Performance at The Game Awards 2020 and from IGN, Performer in a Leading Role at the 17th British Academy Games Awards, and was co-winner of Outstanding Lead Performance in a Drama at the NAVGTR Awards with Johnson. Abby was nominated for Outstanding Achievement in Character at the 24th Annual D.I.C.E. Awards. Bailey is currently nominated for Best Voice Performance at the 19th Game Audio Network Guild Awards.

References

Bibliography 

Action-adventure game characters
Female characters in video games
Fictional American people in video games
Fictional characters from Utah
Fictional characters with neurological or psychological disorders
Fictional female martial artists
Fictional martial artists in video games
Fictional female murderers
Fictional outlaws
Fictional torturers
Fictional slaves in video games
Horror video game characters
The Last of Us
Sony Interactive Entertainment protagonists
Video game characters introduced in 2020
Video game controversies
Woman soldier and warrior characters in video games